Dolemite Is My Name is a 2019 American biographical comedy film directed by Craig Brewer and written by Scott Alexander and Larry Karaszewski. The film stars Eddie Murphy as filmmaker Rudy Ray Moore, who is best known for having portrayed the character of Dolemite in both his stand-up routine and a series of blaxploitation films, which started with Dolemite in 1975.

The film had its world premiere at the Toronto International Film Festival on September 7, 2019. It was released in a limited release on October 4, and streaming on Netflix three weeks later. Dolemite Is My Name received positive reception from both audiences and film critics, with praise for Murphy's performance and the humor. It was chosen by both the National Board of Review and Time magazine as one of the ten best films of the year. At the 77th Golden Globe Awards, the film was nominated for Best Motion Picture – Musical or Comedy and Best Actor for Murphy.

Plot
Struggling artist Rudy Ray Moore works in a record store in 1970s LA, trying to get on the air in the in-store radio station. He moonlights as an MC for his friend Ben Taylor and band at a club. Asking the club owner for a comedy time slot, he is turned down.

One day, homeless man Ricco wanders into the record store, making loud, rhyming proclamations; one of which includes the name “Dolemite”. (The real Moore recorded a number of prominent street poets, including Big Brown.)

Moore creates a stage persona telling stories at the club. Dressing as a pimp and brandishing a cane, he is Dolemite, launching into a crudely humorous and foul-mouthed routine "The Signifying Monkey". Taylor's group join him on-stage as back up. The crowd applauds.

Moore asks his aunt for money to record the comedy album “Eat Out More Often”. His friend Jimmy Lynch records him at his home in front of an audience. Making several copies of the record, Moore sells them out of his car trunk. The record gains popularity, so a record company markets it to record stores. Moore offers to go on tour through the Deep South promoting it. While in Mississippi, he befriends single mother Lady Reed, convincing her to join them.

Celebrating the tour's success at a movie, The Front Page, the theater's majority-white audience finds the film hilarious but Moore and his friends don't. He is inspired to make a film starring as Dolemite. Turned down by a film executive, Moore asks his record company for an advance on royalties to fund it himself. They agree, warning that, if he fails, he will be in debt to them for the rest of his life.

Moore contacts playwright Jerry Jones who, despite initial reluctance, agrees to write the screenplay. Moore and Taylor go to a strip club and find character actor D'Urville Martin, offering him a role in the film. Initially offended, Moore gives him the opportunity to direct the film himself. They convert the old, abandoned Dunbar Hotel into a makeshift soundstage. Jones invites a group of white UCLA film students to be the film crew, including Nicholas Josef von Sternberg as cinematographer.

Moore, Martin, Jones and crew begin filming Dolemite, a kung-fu-themed blaxploitation film, but Moore's unfamiliarity with karate and predilection towards camp disgusts Martin. Despite much of the cast and crew enjoying making the film, he quits soon after filming is completed, but first belittling them, proclaiming the film will never be seen by anyone.

Martin's words seem to come true as no film distributor will purchase the film. Moore returns to touring unenthusiastically. In Indiana, asked about the film's release by a local DJ, he remains noncommittal about whether the film will ever be seen. The DJ offers to premiere it in town with enough promotion. Taking him up on it, Moore single-handedly promotes it all around town. Though he spends a lot on four wall distribution, Moore is pleased to see a massive crowd waiting outside the theater, and the audience greatly enjoys the film.

Hollywood film executive Lawrence Woolner, whose studio Dimension Pictures had previously rejected Dolemite, hears about the Indiana premiere. He contacts Moore, promising to distribute the film. Moore arrives at Dimension Pictures dressed as Dolemite with Lady Reed and the crew dressed up as well. The executive says that, although Moore could continue promoting the film himself, he would not see profits right away. However, Dimension Pictures could put the film in theaters and everyone would profit. Moore agrees, beginning to promote it.

En route to the Hollywood premiere, Moore and the cast read negative reviews of the film, lowering their spirits. Upon arrival, however, the group is astonished to see an even bigger crowd of people cheering for them outside the theater. While the cast and crew go inside to see the film, Moore stays outside to entertain the crowd who must wait for the next show.

Rudy Ray Moore continued to tour and star in sequels to Dolemite until his death in 2008. Today he's considered to be the "Godfather of Rap".

Cast

Production
Murphy has stated that a biopic of Rudy Ray Moore had long been a dream project for him. Murphy initially met screenwriters Scott Alexander and Larry Karaszewski in 2003 and they began developing the project. Murphy arranged a meeting between the two writers with Moore, who told him many of his life stories before his death in 2008. However, the early attempts to make the film never came to fruition.

On June 7, 2018, it was announced that Craig Brewer would direct Dolemite Is My Name from a script by Scott Alexander and Larry Karaszewski with Netflix producing and distributing. Eddie Murphy was set to star as Moore. Later that month, the rest of the principal cast was announced. In July 2018, Chris Rock and Ron Cephas Jones joined the cast. Principal photography began on June 12, 2018. Nicholas Josef von Sternberg, the director of photography of the original Dolemite, visited the set during filming, and according to Brewer, contributed additional stories that didn't make it into the film.

Release

Theatrical and streaming
Dolemite Is My Name had its world premiere at the Toronto International Film Festival on September 7, 2019. It was released in a limited release on October 4, 2019 and digital streaming on October 25, 2019.

Reception

Critical response
The website's critics consensus reads: "In dramatizing Rudy Ray Moore's stranger-than-fiction story, Eddie Murphy makes Dolemite Is My Name just as bold, brash, and ultimately hard to resist as its subject." On Metacritic, it has a weighted average score of 76 out of 100, based on 39 critics, indicating "generally favorable reviews".

In Variety, Owen Gleiberman described Murphy's performance as some kind of a comeback, writing: "As the brash hustler who made Dolemite, Eddie Murphy has his best role in years in a film that's like a blaxploitation answer to The Disaster Artist... He plays Rudy as a cheap but priceless carny barker of his own ego." In the Washington Free Beacon, John Podhoretz compared Dolemite Is My Name to Ed Wood as "a tribute to an entrepreneur" and wrote, "Murphy is just glorious here, deserving of an Oscar he almost surely will not get. This is a beautifully and carefully crafted performance in which the greatest comic talent of his generation succeeds in dimming some of his own extraordinary luster to capture Moore's knowing but essential mediocrity."

Accolades

See also
 List of black films of the 2010s

References

External links 
 
 

2019 films
2019 comedy films
2010s biographical films
African-American comedy films
African-American films
American biographical films
Biographical films about entertainers
Blaxploitation films
Comedy films based on actual events
Davis Entertainment films
English-language Netflix original films
Films about filmmaking
Films about film directors and producers
Films directed by Craig Brewer
Films produced by John Davis
Films scored by Scott Bomar
Films set in the 1970s
Films set in Los Angeles
Films with screenplays by Scott Alexander and Larry Karaszewski
Golden Raspberry Award winning films
2010s English-language films
2010s American films